Masters M75 javelin throw world record progression is the progression of world record improvements of the javelin throw M75 division of Masters athletics.  Records must be set in properly conducted, official competitions under the standing IAAF rules unless modified by World Masters Athletics.

The M75 division consists of male athletes who have reached the age of 75 but have not yet reached the age of 80, so exactly from their 75th birthday to the day before their 80th birthday. The M75 division throws a 500 g implement.

Key

References

Masters Athletics Javelin Throw list

Masters athletics world record progressions
Javelin